Vijay Amritraj was the defending champion, but lost in the third round this year.

Kelly Evernden won the title, defeating Tim Wilkison 6–4, 7–6 in the final.

Seeds

  Henri Leconte (quarterfinals)
  Ramesh Krishnan (second round)
  Jonas Svensson (third round)
  Tim Wilkison (final)
  Peter Doohan (second round)
  Danie Visser (second round)
  Eric Jelen (semifinals)
  Michiel Schapers (semifinals)
  Jaime Yzaga (third round)
  Christo Steyn (second round)
  Eddie Edwards (quarterfinals)
  Nduka Odizor (second round)
  Richard Matuszewski (second round)
  Dan Goldie (second round)
  Éric Winogradsky (quarterfinals)
  Broderick Dyke (second round)

Draw

Finals

Top half

Section 1

Section 2

Bottom half

Section 3

Section 4

External links
 Main draw

1987 Grand Prix (tennis)
1987 Bristol Open